Taser or Tazer can mean:
Taser, an electric-shock weapon
Taser International, the former name of Axon, a firm which makes tasers and other items
Tasar, a type of sailboat
Tazer (musician), a British musician
TASer, internet slang for someone who creates tool-assisted speedruns
Tazer, a song on the soundtrack for the video game Age of Empires 2

See also
Tazers, an American punk rock band